The listing below comprises some of the more prominent houses of Champagne. Most of the major houses are members of the organisation Union de Maisons de Champagne (UMC), and are sometimes referred to as Grandes Marques.

Champagne houses

See also

 History of Champagne
 Champagne production
 Grower Champagne

References

Champagne producers
Wine-related lists

de:Champagner#Die wichtigsten Champagnerhäuser und ihre Prestige-Champagner